Babelomurex couturieri is a species of sea snail, a marine gastropod mollusc in the family Muricidae, the murex snails or rock snails.

Description

Distribution
This marine species occurs off Vietnam, New Britain (in the  Bismarck Archipelago) and Japan.

References

 Jousseaume, F., 1898. Description de coquilles nouvelles. Le Naturaliste 12: 22, sér. 2° série
 Oliverio M. (2008) Coralliophilinae (Neogastropoda: Muricidae) from the southwest Pacific. In: V. Héros, R.H. Cowie & P. Bouchet (eds), Tropical Deep-Sea Benthos 25. Mémoires du Muséum National d'Histoire Naturelle 196: 481–585. page(s): 540
 Kilburn R.N., Marais J.P. & Marais A.P. (2010) Coralliophilinae. pp. 272–292, in: Marais A.P. & Seccombe A.D. (eds), Identification guide to the seashells of South Africa. Volume 1. Groenkloof: Centre for Molluscan Studies. 376 pp.
 Severns M. (2011) Shells of the Hawaiian Islands - The Sea Shells. Conchbooks, Hackenheim. 564 pp.

External links
 MNHN, Paris: syntype

couturieri
Gastropods described in 1898